Anthony Quinton Keasbey (March 1, 1824 – April 4, 1895) was a lawyer who served as United States Attorney for the District of New Jersey under seven presidents. In addition he authored a book on poetry called From the Hudson to the St. Johns and Home Flowers: Pressed in My Law-books. He was also a part of the writing of Marching Song of the First Arkansas, in addition he wrote a law book called Slavery in New Jersey.

Early life
Born in 1824 to Dr. Edward and Mary Parry Keasbey the second of five siblings in Salem, New Jersey, a town colonized by his ancestors. In 1843 he graduated from Yale, and soon after became a law student in the office of Francis L. McCulloch. He finished his studies in Newark, New Jersey, and in October 1846, was admitted to the bar. He entered upon the practice of his profession. In 1855 he entered into a partnership with Cortlaudt Parker, a relation would last for over twenty years.

U.S. attorney
In April 1861, he received the appointment of U.S. attorney for the district of New Jersey from President Lincoln, and in 1865 was reappointed. It was discovered, however, after Lincoln's death, that the commission for his 1865 reappointment had not been signed, and Keasbey was thereupon appointed by President Johnson until the next session of the senate. In 1866, he was regularly commissioned for another term of four years. In 1870 he was reappointed by President Grant, and again in 1874. In 1879 the office was once more accorded to him for a term of four years. He thus held this position continuously from the spring of 1861 to that of 1886, a period of unbroken incumbency longer than that of any other U.S. district attorney in the Union.

Later life
In 1876 the partnership which existed between Keasbey and Parker was dissolved, and Keasbey associated with himself his two of his sons, Edward Quinton and George, under the firm name of A.Q. Keasbey & Sons. He made several valuable contributions to the pamphlet and periodical literature of his day, and without seeking reputation as a poet, wrote and privately printed for many beautiful verses such as his book From the Hudson to the St. John's. He authored a few books under a pseudonym and some anonymously, and books have been made from his notes and poems after his death.

Death
Keasbey died on April 4, 1895, while in Rome.

Bibliography
Some of Anthony's writings

References

1824 births
1895 deaths
19th-century American male writers
19th-century American lawyers
19th-century American poets
19th-century pseudonymous writers
American people of English descent
American poets
American male poets
People from Newark, New Jersey
People from Salem, New Jersey
Poets from New Jersey
New Jersey lawyers
United States Attorneys for the District of New Jersey
Writers from Newark, New Jersey
Yale University alumni